Ursula Mohan is a British actress. From 25 May 1966 she appeared in Sławomir Mrożek's play Tango at the Aldwych Theatre alongside Patience Collier, Mike Pratt, Peter Jeffrey and Dudley Sutton under director Trevor Nunn. In 2014 and 2016 she took the title role in Phil Willmott's Queen Lear, an adaptation of William Shakespeare's King Lear.

In film she has had minor roles in The Bank Job (2008), Tell Me Lies (1968), and The Girl (1996), she has also appeared in the 1969–1972 TV series On the Buses. and the ITV drama London's Burning

Ursula Mohan currently lives in London with Ian Watt-Smith.

References

External links
 

British actresses
British stage actresses
1946 births
Living people